WLCA (89.9 FM) is a student-run radio station owned and operated by Lewis and Clark Community College in Godfrey, Illinois.  It currently plays an alternative rock/college radio format.  It can be heard in the northern St. Louis, Missouri market area, as well as the city of St. Louis and parts of the Metro-East area.

Awards
WLCA was the recipient of the 2001 and 2002 Achievement In Radio Award for the best student-run radio station in the St. Louis market.

External links
WLCA official website
College Website
89.9 WLCA Facebook

References 

LCA
Modern rock radio stations in the United States
Radio stations established in 1974
1974 establishments in Illinois